Parrish "P. J." Hill Jr. (born January 3, 1987) is a former American football running back. He was originally signed by the New Orleans Saints as an undrafted free agent in 2009. He played college football at the University of Wisconsin–Madison.

Hill has also been a member of the Philadelphia Eagles and Washington Redskins.

College career
After graduating from Poly Prep Country Day School in Brooklyn, New York in 2005, Hill attended Wisconsin.  Hill is one of just three players in Wisconsin Badgers history to have rushed for 1,000 yards in each of their first three seasons. He is one of two players to score at least ten rushing touchdowns in their first three years. Hill ranks sixth on the school's career rushing yardage list with 3,942 yards and is tied for sixth on Wisconsin's career rushing touchdowns list with 42. His 44 total touchdowns (42 rushing and two receiving) place him sixth in school history. He is fourth on the school's list for career rushing attempts with 770. He averaged 5.1 yards per carry during his 36-game career (tied for tenth all-time at Wisconsin). He rushed for at least 100 yards in a game 20 times (fifth-most in school history).

Statistics

Professional career

First stint with Saints
On April 27, 2009, a day after being undrafted in the 2009 NFL Draft,  Hill signed a 3-year contract with the New Orleans Saints. He ran for 128 yards on 26 carries with 3 touchdowns and had 2 catches for 9 yards in the 2009 preseason. He was waived by the Saints on September 5, 2009 and then re-signed to their practice squad the following day.

Philadelphia Eagles
Hill was signed off the Saints practice squad by the Philadelphia Eagles on October 28, 2009. He was waived on December 14 and subsequently re-signed to the Eagles' practice squad on December 16.

Washington Redskins
Hill was signed off the Eagles' practice squad by the Washington Redskins on December 30, 2009.

He was waived on May 3, 2010.

Second stint with Saints
Hill was claimed off waivers by the New Orleans Saints on May 4, 2010.  He suffered a torn triceps in a preseason exhibition game on August 21, 2010, and after clearing waivers he was placed on injured reserve.

He was waived February 10, 2011.

References

External links
 New Orleans Saints bio

1987 births
Living people
Sportspeople from Queens, New York
Players of American football from New York City
American football running backs
Wisconsin Badgers football players
New Orleans Saints players
Philadelphia Eagles players
Washington Redskins players
Poly Prep alumni